Martin Julio Aliaga Bungerfeldt (born 30 April 1971) is a Swedish actor.

In 2000, Aliaga finished his education at NAMA. He has been engaged at the Royal Dramatic Theatre, Stockholm City Theatre and Teater Tribunalen. He is married to Josefin Crafoord and together they have a son.

Selected filmography
Johan Falk – Leo Gaut (2009)
In Your Veins (2008)
 2007 – Gangster
Överallt och ingenstans (2003)
Beck – Hämndens pris (2001)
 2001 – Festival
 1998 – Längtans blåa blomma
Kvinnan i det låsta rummet (1997)
Sairaan kaunis maailma (1997)
 1996 – Anna Holt
 1995 – Svarta skallar och vita nätter

References

External links

1971 births
Swedish male actors
Living people